Ponometia elegantula, the Arizona bird dropping moth, is a species of bird dropping moth in the family Noctuidae. The species was first described by Leon F. Harvey in 1876.

The MONA or Hodges number for Ponometia elegantula is 9109.

References

Further reading

External links
 

Acontiinae
Articles created by Qbugbot
Moths described in 1876

Taxa named by Leon F. Harvey